Romy Gruber (born 7 February 1993) is a Luxembourger former footballer who played as a midfielder. She has been a member of the Luxembourg women's national team.

References

1993 births
Living people
Women's association football midfielders
Luxembourgian women's footballers
Luxembourg women's international footballers